Captain Baker may refer to:
 James A. Baker (born 1857) (1857–1941), American attorney
 Valentine Baker (pilot) (1888–1942), British Armed Forces pilot
 Captain Baker, character in Bullitt
 Jay Baker, American sheriff for Cherokee County, Georgia involved in the 2021 Atlanta spa shootings

See also
 Joe Baker-Cresswell (1901–1997), Royal Navy officer